Fedrigoni is a large paper manufacturer in Italy which owns paper mills in Verona, Arco di Trento, Riva del Garda, Fabriano and Pioraco.

In November 2022, it was announced Fedrigoni had acquired the Boussières-based manufacturer of specialty papers for wine and spirits labels, Papeterie Zuber Rieder.

See also

 Cartiere Miliani Fabriano
 List of Italian companies

References
Official company site

Manufacturing companies established in 1888
Italian companies established in 1888
Pulp and paper companies of Italy
Italian brands
Companies based in Veneto
Bain Capital companies